The Cold Embrace of Fear – A Dark Romantic Symphony is the second EP by the Italian symphonic power metal band Rhapsody of Fire. It is essentially one long, orchestral song divided into seven acts. The album was recorded at the same time as their previous album The Frozen Tears of Angels and released on 15 October 2010 in Europe.

Track listing

Charts

Concept
After being in the village of Ainor, Iras' discovery from studying the documents and scripts, revealed the location of Erian's Book. The troubling discovery was that the Book lay inside Har-Kuun, the ancient fortress of the Disciples of the Black Order, which was deep in the Dark Lands. Iras, along with Khaas, Dargor, and the Elvish King, Tarish, set out on their journey to Har-Kuun. Once they arrived they found the place had been deserted. Erian's book was nestled under a Dragon made of stone. As Iras opened the book, Tarish attacked him and said he would kill Dargor if he didn't give him the book. Tarish was an agent of the Black Order and had betrayed them. Tarish then wrested with Dargor over the book, as Iras watched before falling unconscious from injury. But just before, he saw that not only did Dargor win the battle; but before dying, Tarish was able to tear some pages out of Erian's book.

Later Iras regained consciousness, and immediately checked the book. He was relieved to see the Tarish had only torn out a few pages. Leaving Har-Kuun, they then journeyed to the village of Nairin, home of the little elves where they could rest. Iras received healing from the elves magical arts for his injuries. After recovering he was finally able to examine Erian's book. The words within were not only clear, but tragic and prophetic as well and was referred to as "A Revelation of Angels".

The conclusion is continued on From Chaos to Eternity.

Notes
 The Ancient Fires of Har-Kuun is styled as one of the band's signature epics.
 Neve Rosso Sangue is an Italian ballad.
 Erian's Lost Secrets is a mid-tempo song.
 The rest of the tracks are narrative, with atmospheric orchestrations.

References

Rhapsody of Fire EPs
2010 EPs
Nuclear Blast EPs